The slow movement (sometimes capitalised Slow movement or Slow Movement) advocates a cultural shift toward slowing down life's pace. It began with Carlo Petrini's protest against the opening of a McDonald's restaurant in Piazza di Spagna, Rome, in 1986 that sparked the creation of the slow food movement. Over time, this developed into a subculture in other areas, like the Cittaslow organisation for "slow cities". The "slow" epithet has subsequently been applied to a variety of activities and aspects of culture.

Geir Berthelsen and his creation of The World Institute of Slowness presented a vision in 1999 for an entire "slow planet" and a need to teach the world the way of slowness. In Carl Honoré's 2004 book, In Praise of Slow, he describes the slow movement thus:

Professor Guttorm Fløistad summarises the philosophy, stating:

The slow movement is not organised and controlled by a single organisation. A fundamental characteristic of the slow movement is that it is propounded, and its momentum maintained, by individuals who constitute an expanding global community. Its popularity has grown considerably since the rise of slow food and Cittaslow in Europe, with slowness initiatives spreading worldwide.

Slow Art and Slow Art Day 

Slow Art Day is a global art movement, which was founded by Phil Terry and officially launched in 2009. During one day in April each year, museums and art galleries across the world host events focused on intentionally experiencing art slowly through slow looking. The movement aims to help people to discover the joy of looking at art, typically through observing a painting or sculpture for 10–15 minutes, often followed by discussion. The Slow Art Day HQ team publishes an Annual Report each year on their website, which features a range of events hosted by art institutions.

Ageing

Slow ageing (or slow aging) is a scientifically backed and distinct approach to successful ageing, advocating a personal and wholly encompassing positive choice to the process of ageing. Established as part of the broader slow movement in the 1980s, as opposed to the interventionist-based and commercially backed medical anti-aging system, it involves personal ownership and non-medical intervention options in gaining potential natural life extension.

Cinema 

Slow cinema is a cinematography style which derives from the art film genre and which consists in conveying a sense of calculated slowness to the viewer. Slow films often consist of a resistance to movement and emotion, a lack of causality and a devotion to realism. This is usually obtained through the use of long takes, minimalist acting, slow or inexistent camera movements, unconventional use of music and sparse editing. Well-known slow cinema directors are Béla Tarr, Nuri Bilge Ceylan, Abbas Kiarostami, Tsai Ming-Liang, Andrei Tarkovsky and Theo Angelopoulos.

Cittaslow 

The goal of the Cittaslow organisation is to resist the homogenisation and globalisation of towns and cities. It seeks to improve the quality and enjoyment of living by encouraging happiness and self-determination. Cittaslow cities use the concept of glocalization to prevent the impending globalization of their cities. Lisa Servon and Sarah Pink observe that, "The case of the Spanish Cittaslow towns offers a particular example of how towns can actively exploit the interpenetration of the global and the local. In these towns, a local–global relationship has emerged in ways that enable controlled development and the maintenance of local uniqueness."

Consumption
Tim Cooper, author of Longer Lasting Products, insists on "slow consumption". He goes on to say, "The issue to address is what kind of economy is going to be sustainable in its wider sense- eco- nomically, environmentally and socially." Saul Griffith introduced "heirloom design" during a February Greener Gadgets conference in 2009. He notes a lasting design, the ability to repair, and the option of being modernized to advocate slow consumption. Legislation, alternative options, and consumer pressure can encourage manufacturers to design items in a more heirloom fashion.

Counseling 

Recent technological advances have resulted in a fast-paced style of living. Slow counselors understand that many clients are seeking ways to reduce stress and cultivate a more balanced approach to life. Developed by Dr. Randy Astramovich and Dr. Wendy Hoskins and rooted in the slow movement, slow counseling offers counselors a wellness focused foundation for addressing the time urgency and stress often reported by clients.

Conversation 

An Unhurried Conversation uses a simple process to allow people to take turns to speak without being interrupted. Everyone agrees at the start that only the person holding a chosen object is allowed to talk. Once the speaker has finished, they put the object down, signalling that they have said what they want to say. Someone else then picks up the object and takes their turn. Each speaker can respond to some or all of what the previous speaker said, or they can take the conversation in an entirely new direction.

Unhurried Conversations is a term used by the author of Unhurried at Work Johnnie Moore, about how people can work together at a speed that makes the most of their human qualities.

Education 

As an alternative approach to modern faster styles of reading, such as speed reading, the concept of slow reading has been reintroduced as an educational branch of the slow movement. For instance, the ancient Greek method of slow reading known as Lectio, which is now known as Lectio Divina, has become a way of reading that encourages more in-depth analysis and a greater understanding of the text being read. 
Though the method is originally of Christian monastic origin, and has been used primarily as a tool to better understand the Bible, its technique can be applied in other areas of education besides the study of theology.

Fashion 

The term slow fashion was coined by Kate Fletcher in 2007 (Centre for Sustainable Fashion, UK). "Slow fashion is not a seasonal trend that comes and goes like animal print, but a sustainable fashion movement that is gaining momentum."

The slow fashion style is based on the same principles of the slow food movement, as the alternative to mass-produced clothing (also known as fast fashion). Initially, the slow clothing movement was intended to reject all mass-produced clothing, referring only to clothing made by hand, but has broadened to include many interpretations and is practiced in various ways. Functional and fashion novelty drives consumers to replace their items faster, causing an increase of imported goods into the United States alone. It was reported by the Economic Policy Institute that in 2007, the U.S. imported six billion dollars' worth in fashion articles. Popular brands, such as Patagonia, make products that are made to endure the test of time and be environmentally conscious.

Some examples of slow fashion practices include:
 Opposing and boycotting mass-produced "fast fashion" or "McFashion"
 Choosing artisan products to support smaller businesses, fair trade and locally-made clothes
 Buying secondhand or vintage clothing and donating unwanted garments
 Choosing clothing made with sustainable, ethically made or recycled fabrics
 Choosing quality garments that will last longer, transcend trends (a "classic" style), and be repairable
 Doing it yourself: making, mending, customising, altering, and up-cycling one's own clothing
 Slowing the rate of fashion consumption: buying fewer clothes less often

The slow fashion ethos is a unified representation of all the "sustainable", "eco", "green", and "ethical" fashion movements. It encourages education about the garment industry's connection with and impact on the environment, such as depleting resources, slowing of the supply chain to reduce the number of trends and seasons and to encourage quality production, and return greater value to garments, removing the image of disposability of fashion. A key phrase repeatedly heard in reference to slow fashion is "quality over quantity". This phrase is used to summarise the basic principles of slowing down the rate of clothing consumption by choosing garments that last longer. Thinking beyond fashion seasons, Loro Piano has referred to items that can be used throughout seasons as "permanent fashion". Some designers, such as Amy Twigger Holroyd, seek for their garments to be passed down through generations by one having personal attachments to them. Hazel Clark states there are "three lines of reflection: the valuing of local resources and distributed economies; transparent production systems with less intermediation between producer and consumer, and sustainable and sensorial products ..."

Food 

As opposed to the culture of fast food, the sub-movement known as slow food seeks to encourage the enjoyment of regional produce and traditional foods, which are often grown organically and to enjoy these foods in the company of others. It aims to defend agricultural biodiversity.

The movement claims 83,000 members in 50 countries, which are organised into 800 Convivia or local chapters. Sometimes operating under a logo of a snail, the collective philosophy is to preserve and support traditional ways of life. Today, 42 states in the United States have their own convivium.

In 2004, representatives from food communities in more than 150 countries met in Turin, Italy, under the umbrella of the Terra Madre (Mother Earth) network.

Gaming 
Slow gaming is an approach to video games that is meant to be more slow-paced and more focused on challenging the assumptions and feelings of the player than on their skills and reflexes.

A "Slow Games Movement Manifesto" was written by Scottish game designer Mitch Alexander in September 2018, and a "Slow Gaming Manifesto" was independently published on Gamasutra by Polish game designer Artur Ganszyniec in June 2019.

Some games that can be considered examples of "slow gaming" include: Firewatch (2016), Heaven's Vault (2019), Journey (2012), Wanderlust Travel Stories (2019), and The Longing (2020).

Gardening 

Slow gardening is an approach that helps gardeners savor what they grow using all their senses through all the seasons.

Goods 

Slow goods takes its core direction from various elements of the overall slow movement and applying it to the concept, design and manufacturing of physical objects. It focuses on low production runs, the usage of craftspeople within the process and on-shore manufacturing. Proponents of this philosophy seek and collaborate with smaller, local supply and service partners.

Slow goods practitioners must have those tenets baked into their business model, it must be the top driver in the procurement of sustainable materials and manufacturing techniques. The rationale for this local engagement facilitates the assurance of quality, the revitalisation of local manufacturing industries and reduces greatly the footprint related to the shipment of goods across regions of land and or water.

Again, quality always supersedes quantity. The genesis of a product is becoming more of concern for consumers. Some companies have now woven this philosophy into their corporate structure. The source of a product and its parts has become increasingly more important.

Physical goods affected by the slow movement represent much diversity, including architecture and building design. The slow movement is affecting the concept and planning stages of commercial buildings, chiefly LEED certified projects.

This movement seeks to break current conventions of perpetuating the disposable nature of mass production. By using higher-quality materials and craftsmanship, items attain a longer lifespan that harkens back to manufacturing golden era of the past.

Living 

Slow living is a lifestyle choice. Authors Beth Meredith and Eric Storm summarize slow living as follows:

Marketing 
Slow marketing is a reaction to the perceived "always-on" nature of digital marketing.  It emphasizes a customer-centric outlook, sustainability, and ethics.  Slow marketing builds relationships with customers instead of encouraging immediate results, such as a limited time offer.

Media 
 
Slow media and Slow television are movements aiming at sustainable and focused media production as well as media consumption. They formed in the context of a massive acceleration of news distribution ending in almost real-time digital media such as Twitter. Beginning in 2010, many local Slow Media initiatives formed in the USA and Europe (Germany, France, Italy) leading to a high attention in mass-media. Others experiment with a reduction of their daily media intake and log their efforts online ("slow media diet").

Medicine

Slow medicine fosters taking time in developing a relationship between the practitioner and the patient, and in applying medical knowledge, technology and treatment to the specific and unique character of the patient in his or her overall situation.

Money 
Slow Money is a specific non-profit organisation, founded to organise investors and donors to steer new sources of capital to small food enterprises, organic farms, and local food systems. Slow Money takes its name from the Slow Food movement. Slow Money aims to develop the relationship between capital markets and place, including social and soil fertility. Slow Money is supporting the grass-roots mobilisation through network building, convening, publishing, and incubating intermediary strategies and structures of funding.

Parenting 

Slow parenting encourages parents to plan less for their children, allowing them to explore the world at their own pace. It is a response to hyper-parenting and helicopter parenting; the widespread trend for parents to schedule activities and classes after school every day and every weekend, to solve problems on behalf of the children, and to buy commercial services and products. It was described by Carl Honoré in Under Pressure: Rescuing Our Children from the Culture Of Hyper-Parenting.

Photography 

Slow photography is a term describing a tendency in today's contemporary photography and visual arts. In response to the spread of the snapshot, artists and photographers retake manual techniques and working methods to work slower, manually and in constant dialogue with the physical materials of the images. A broader interpretation of Slow Photography applies to all kinds of image-making, including film and digital processes. The effort is a collaboration by several photographers to promote the slowing down of experiencing places, and the making of stronger connections to place. The effort offers an alternative to the quick-hit images that saturate social media, which usually lack in content and story-telling. As of October 2019 the main contributors to the website are photographers Ernesto Ruiz, Jennifer Renwick, and Beth Young. Apart from their writings, their work has included Slow Photography focused exhibitions and seminars.

The term was first introduced by Norwegian photographer, artist and photo educator Johanne Seines Svendsen in the article "The Slow Photography – In Motion", published in the book Through a Glass, Darkly in January 2013, in collaboration with the North Norwegian Art Center, the Arts Council of Norway, and the Norwegian Photographical Fund.

The term was put into shape in the installation The Slow Photography at The 67th North Norwegian Art Exhibition, first opened in the city of Bodø in January 2013. The installation contained five original ambrotypes and alumitypes presented in a monter; and presents contemporary work with the historical photographical process wet-plate collodion (1851–1880).

Religion 
Slow church is a movement in Christian praxis which integrates slow-movement principles into the structure and character of the local church.  The phrase was introduced in 2008 by Christian bloggers working independently who imagined what such a "slow church" might look like.  Over the next several years, the concept continued to be discussed online and in print by various writers and ministers.

In July 2012, a three-day conference titled Slow Church: Abiding Together in the Patient Work of God was held on the campus of DePaul University in Chicago on the topic of slow church and featured Christian ethicist Stanley Hauerwas and Kyle Childress, among others. An online blog called "Slow Church" written by C. Christopher Smith and John Pattison is hosted by Patheos, and Smith and Pattison have written a book by the same name, published in June 2014.

Ethics, ecology, and economy are cited as areas of central concern to slow church. Smith describes slow church as a "conversation", not a movement, and has cited New Monasticism as an influence. In its emphases on non-traditional ways for churches to operate and on "conversation" over dogma and hierarchy, slow church is also related to the broader Christian "emerging church" movement.

Scholarship 
Slow scholarship is a response to hasty scholarship and the demands of corporatized neoliberal academic culture, which may compromise the quality and integrity of research, education and well-being. This movement attempts to counter the erosion of humanistic education, analyze the consequences of the culture of speed, and "explores alternatives to the fast-paced, metric-oriented neoliberal university through a slow-moving conversation on ways to slow down and claim time for slow scholarship and collective action."

Science 

The slow science movement's objective is to enable scientists to take the time to think and read. The prevalent culture of science is publish or perish, where scientists are judged to be better if they publish more papers in less time, and only those who do so are able to maintain their careers. Those who practice and promote slow science suggest that "society should give scientists the time they need".

Technology 
The slow technology approach aims to emphasise that technology can support reflection rather than efficiency. This approach has been discussed through various examples, for example those in interaction design or virtual environments. It is related to other parallel efforts such as those towards reflective design, critical design and critical technical practice.

Thought (philosophy) 
Slow thought calls for a slow philosophy to ease thinking into a more playful and porous dialogue about what it means to live. Vincenzo Di Nicola's "Slow Thought Manifesto" elucidates and illuminates Slow thought through seven proclamations, published and cited in English, Indonesian, Italian, and Portuguese, and frequently cited in French:

 Slow thought is marked by peripatetic Socratic walks, the face-to-face encounter of Emmanuel Levinas, and Mikhail Bakhtin’s dialogic conversations
 Slow thought creates its own time and place
 Slow thought has no other object than itself
 Slow thought is porous
 Slow thought is playful
 Slow thought is a counter-method, rather than a method, for thinking as it relaxes, releases and liberates thought from its constraints and the trauma of tradition
 Slow thought is deliberate

Notable slow thinkers include Mahatma Gandhi who affirmed that, "There is more to life than simply increasing its speed", Giorgio Agamben (on the philosophy of childhood), Walter Benjamin (on the porosity of Naples), and Johan Huizinga (on play as an interlude in our daily lives). Di Nicola's Slow Thought Manifesto is featured in Julian Hanna's The Manifesto Handbook as a reaction against acceleration, "elucidating seven principles, including the practice of being 'asynchronic' or resisting the speed of modern times in favor of the 'slow logic of thought' and working toward greater focus". The Slow Thought Manifesto is being cited in philosophy, information science, and peacebuilding politics.

"Take your time", the slogan of Slow Thought, cited by Di Nicola, is taken from philosopher Ludwig Wittgenstein, himself a slow thinker:

"In a wonderful philosophical lesson that is structured like a joke, Wittgenstein admonished philosophers about rushing their thinking:

Question: 'How does one philosopher address another?'

Answer: 'Take your time.

Time poverty 

The principal perspective of the slow movement is to experience life in a fundamentally different way. Adherents believe that the experience of being present leads to what Abraham Maslow refers to as peak experience.

The International Institute of Not Doing Much is a humorous approach to the serious topic of "time poverty", incivility, and workaholism. The Institute's fictional presence promotes counter-urgency. First created in 2005, SlowDownNow.org is a continually evolving work of art and humor which reports it has over 6,000 members.

Travel 

Slow travel is an evolving movement that has taken its inspiration from nineteenth-century European travel writers, such as Théophile Gautier, who reacted against the cult of speed, prompting some modern analysts to ask, "If we have slow food and slow cities, then why not slow travel?". Other literary and exploration traditions, from early Arab travelers to late nineteenth-century Yiddish writers, have also identified with slow travel, usually marking its connection with community as its most distinctive feature. Espousing modes of travel that were the norm in some less developed societies became, for some writers and travelers from western Europe such as Isabelle Eberhardt, a way of engaging more seriously with those societies.

Slow travel is not only about traveling from one place to another, it is also about immersing oneself in a destination. It consists of staying in the same place for a while to develop a deep connection with it. Frequenting local places, spending time with locals and discovering their habits and customs can turn a regular trip into a slow travel experience. The key is to take one's time and to let oneself be carried along.

Advocates of slow travel argue that all too often the potential pleasure of the journey is lost by too-eager anticipation of arrival. Slow travel, it is asserted, is a state of mind which allows travelers to engage more fully with communities along their route, often favoring visits to spots enjoyed by local residents rather than merely following guidebooks. As such, slow travel shares some common values with ecotourism. Its advocates and devotees generally look for low-impact travel styles, even to the extent of eschewing flying. The future of Slow Travel is aiming toward reducing greenhouse gas emissions by reducing car and air travel because the rate we are using planes and cars is not sustainable for our atmosphere. Advocates believe that the combination of environmental awareness and cost efficient traveling will move people towards Slow Travel.

Aspects of slow travel, including some of the principles detailed in the "Manifesto for Slow Travel", are now increasingly featured in travel writing. The magazine Hidden Europe, which first published the "Manifesto for Slow Travel", has particularly showcased slow travel, featuring articles that focus on unhurried, low-impact journeys and advocating a stronger engagement with communities that lie en route.

A new book series launched in May 2010 by Bradt Travel Guides explicitly espouses slow travel ideas with volumes that focus very much on local communities within a tightly defined area, often advocating the use of public transport along the way. Titles include Bus-pass Britain, Slow Norfolk and Suffolk, Slow Devon and Exmoor, Slow Cotswolds, Slow North Yorkshire and Slow Sussex and South Downs National Park.

See also
African time
Carl Honoré
Degrowth
Downshifting (lifestyle)
In Praise of Slow
Money-rich, time-poor
Patience
Product tracing systems, which allow people to see the source factory of a product
Simple living
Slow architecture
Slow journalism
Slow living
Slow media
Slow reading
Work-life balance

References

External links 

 
Lifestyle
Self-care
Simple living
1986 introductions
Underground culture